Jayden Okunbor (born 2 March 1997) is an Australian professional rugby league footballer who plays as a er for the Canterbury-Bankstown Bulldogs feeder team in the NSW Cup

Background
Okunbor was born in Sydney, New South Wales, Australia, and is of Zimbabwean and Nigerian descent on his father's side.
 
Okunbor played his junior football for the Milperra Colts and attended Picnic Point High School before being signed by the Canterbury-Bankstown Bulldogs.

Playing career

Early career
Okunbor played in the Bulldogs Under-20s team in 2015–2017.
 
Okunbor spent 2018 playing in the Bulldogs 2018 NSW Cup premiership winning team. On 23 September 2018, Okunbor played on the wing in the Bulldogs NSW Cup Grand Final against the Newtown Jets in the 18–12 victory at Leichhardt Oval. In the following week, on 30 September 2018, Okunbor played on the Wing in the State Championship Final against Queensland Cup winners the Redcliffe Dolphins, scoring a try in the 42–18 win.

2019
In Round 3 of the 2019 NRL season, Okunbor made his NRL debut for the Canterbury-Bankstown Bulldogs against the Wests Tigers, playing on the wing and having a solid match registering 214 metres in Canterbury's 22–8 win at Campbelltown Stadium. In the next match in Round 4 against the Melbourne Storm, Okunbor had a powerhouse performance, scoring his first NRL career try, and ran for a whopping 290 metres even busting through 2 tackles from Storm captain Cameron Smith during Canterbury's unlucky 18–16 loss at AAMI Park. On 29 April 2019, Okunbor was rewarded with a 2-year extension with Canterbury to the end of the 2021 season.

On 21 May, Okunbor was ruled out for 6 weeks after suffering a toe ligament injury in Canterbury's Round 10 victory over the Gold Coast where Okunbor had scored 2 tries.

Okunbor made a total of 10 appearances for Canterbury in the 2019 NRL season as the club finished 12th on the table.  At one stage, Canterbury-Bankstown found themselves sitting last on the table and in real danger of finishing with the wooden spoon.  However, for the third straight season, Canterbury achieved four upset victories in a row over Penrith, the Wests Tigers, South Sydney and Parramatta who were all competing for a place in the finals series and were higher on the table.  Pay was credited with the late season revival as the side focused heavily on defence.

2020
After being reinstated to the Canterbury club, Okunbor played his first game of the 2020 NRL season in round 18 against Manly-Warringah where Canterbury lost 32-20.

2021 
Okunbor missed the first half of the 2021 NRL season due to an injury to his Anterior Cruciate Ligament, suffered in Canterbury's final game of the 2020 NRL season against the Penrith Panthers. He played his first game in Round 18 and scored a try in Canterbury's 32-24 loss to the South Sydney Rabbitohs.

On 20 July, the Canterbury club announced that Okunbor had re-signed a contract for a further two-years, keeping him at the club until the end of 2023.

Okunbor made a total of seven appearances for Canterbury and scored five tries in the 2021 NRL season as the club finished last and claimed the Wooden Spoon.

2022
Okunbor was limited to only six matches for Canterbury in the 2022 NRL season as the club finished 12th on the table. Okunbor played for Canterbury in their 2022 NSW Cup Grand Final loss to Penrith.

Controversy
On 10 March 2020, Okunbor was stood down by Canterbury just two days before the start of the 2020 NRL season after it was alleged he met with two women during a pre-season trip to Port Macquarie earlier in March along with teammate Corey Harawira-Naera. Whilst a sexual encounter was alleged to occur, the women were of the age of consent and there was no criminal investigation pending.  Both players were asked to "show cause" why the NRL should not cancel or suspend their registrations as players.

On 11 March 2020, it was revealed that Okunbor had used Instagram to contact one of the women.  In a leaked message obtained through Fox Sports, Okunbor said to the girl "Yeah had to have a good look, what are we doing tonight?".

On the same day, it was revealed that because of the two players' actions, new major sponsor Rashays had cancelled their $2 million sponsorship with the club.  Rashays had signed on to become Canterbury's front of shirt sponsor.  Rashays owner Rami Ykmour released a statement saying "It’s a shame two players could wreck it for everyone, It’s disgusting. It's repulsive, to be honest. That’s something else. If they sack them, I would stand by the club and the NRL’s decision".

On 1 April 2020, Okunbor had his contract terminated by Canterbury-Bankstown and was also deregistered by the NRL.  Canterbury released a statement saying "The NRL have today deregistered both Jayden Okunbor and Corey Harawira-Naera with immediate effect and as a result their playing contracts with the Bulldogs have been cancelled, The conduct of the two players, on the eve of our final trial match, demonstrated an unacceptable lack of respect for their teammates, their coach and club officials, our hosts in Port Macquarie and fans of the game everywhere".

On 8 April 2020, both players opted to appeal their contract terminations at an NRL Appeals Tribunal (an independent hearing headed by high court judge Ian Callinan AC QC). 

On 13 July 2020, the NRL Appeals Tribunal agreed (with the players appeal) that the punishment was too harsh, reversing the decision to deregister both Okunbor and Corey Harawira-Naera effective immediately. Okunbor was retrospectively given a 14 game ban (from the date of contract termination), a $22,500 fine and a course of counselling / community service. Corey Harawira-Neara received a retrospective 10 game ban (from the date of contract termination), and a $15,000 fine.

References

External links
Bulldogs profile

1997 births
Living people
Australian rugby league players
Australian people of Nigerian descent
Australian people of Zimbabwean descent
Canterbury-Bankstown Bulldogs players
Rugby league players from Sydney
Rugby league wingers